Grant Richard James Evans (11 October 194816 September 2014) was an Australian anthropologist and historian notable for his works on Laos.

Life
Grant was born in Berri, South Australia on 11 October 1948.

He received his Ph.D. from La Trobe in 1983, and for many years taught anthropology at the University of Hong Kong.

In 2005, he moved permanently to Vientiane, where he was a senior research fellow at the École française d'Extrême-Orient.

He died in Vientiane on 16 September 2014.

Notable works
Evans, Grant (1983). The Yellow Rainmakers: Are Chemical Weapons Being Used in Southeast Asia?. London: Verso.
Evans, Grant, and Kelvin Rowley (1984). Red Brotherhood at War: Indochina since the Fall of Saigon. London: Verso.
Evans, Grant (1988). Agrarian Change in Communist Laos. Singapore: Institute of Southeast Asian Studies.
Evans, Grant, and Kelvin Rowley (1990). Red Brotherhood at War: Vietnam, Cambodia and Laos since 1975. London: Verso.
Evans, Grant (1990). Lao Peasants under Socialism. New Haven: Yale University Press.
Evans, Grant (1995). Lao Peasants under Socialism and Post-Socialism. Chiang Mai: Silkworm Books.
Evans, Grant (1998). The Politics of Ritual and Remembrance: Laos since 1975. Honolulu: University of Hawai'i Press.
Evans, Grant (ed.) (1999). Laos: Culture and Society. Chiang Mai: Silkworm Books.
Evans, Grant (2002). A Short History of Laos: The Land in Between. Crows Nest, New South Wales: Allen & Unwin.
Evans, Grant (2009). The Last Century of Lao Royalty: A Documentary History. Chiang Mai: Silkworm Books.

Notes

References

External links
Interview conducted by Boike Rehbein on 1 March 2009. Published in January 2011 in the Journal of Lao Studies, Vol.2, No.1, pp.97107.

Australian anthropologists
Australian historians
1948 births
2014 deaths